McFall is a surname, a variant spelling of Gaelic MacPhail meaning "son of Paul". Notable people with the surname include:

John J. McFall (1918–2006), American politician
John McFall, Baron McFall of Alcluith (born 1944), United Kingdom politician
Leah McFall, Northern-Irish singer-songwriter

See also
McFall, Missouri
USS McFaul